Saratoga Gap Open Space Preserve is a 1540-acre regional park located near Saratoga Gap in the Santa Cruz Mountains of Santa Clara County, California. The preserve is owned and operated by the Midpeninsula Regional Open Space District. The preserve contains about 2 miles (3 km) of hiking trails, which are open to equestrians and bicycles.

Saratoga Gap contains elements of the Bay Area Ridge Trail, a large and partially complete regional trail.

The preserve is forested with oak and evergreen trees.

References

See also
 Big Basin Redwoods State Park
 Boulder Creek, California
 Castle Rock State Park
 Saratoga, California

Midpeninsula Regional Open Space District
Protected areas of Santa Clara County, California
Protected areas of Santa Cruz County, California
Nature reserves in California
Parks in the San Francisco Bay Area
Santa Cruz Mountains
Bay Area Ridge Trail